Ana Laura Cordeiro  is a Brazilian submission grappler, 3rd-degree black belt Brazilian jiu-jitsu (BJJ) practitioner and coach.

A multiple-time IBJJF World (Gi and No-Gi) and IBJJF Pan champion in the lower belts divisions, Cordeiro is a three-time black belt World champion, two-time No-Gi World champion, two-time Pan Champion and ADCC Submission Fighting World Champion. Famously undefeated at one time with a record of 65–0, Cordeiro has been described as: “one of the greatest female grapplers to have graced the sport”, and "one of the most accomplished women in Jiu-Jitsu history".

Career 
Ana Laura Gonçalves Cordeiro was raised in Minas Gerais, Brazil. She started training Brazilian jiu-jitsu (BJJ) at the age of 17. To compete she started training at the Gracie Barra academy in Brasilia, under the supervision of Carlos Gracie Jr., a 3-hour bus journey from her home. After receiving her blue belt she became World champion in 2006, promoted to purple belt the following year she won double gold at the World Championship, winning her weight division and the openweight category. A year later, competing as a brown belt, she won the World Championship title for the fourth time, also winning double gold at the 2008 IBJJF World No-Gi Championship in the combined female brown/black belt division.

Cordeiro moved to the US in 2009 receiving her black belt from Gracie Barra founder, Carlos Gracie Jr.. While a serious back injury unexpectedly interrupted her competitive career for 5 years, she is still regarded as "one of the greatest female grapplers to have graced the sport". In 2014 she returned to competition winning gold at the Las Vegas International Championship, then winning the following year the ADCC Submission Fighting World Championship the most prestigious tournament in submission grappling.

Brazilian Jiu-Jitsu competitive summary 
Main Achievements:
 IBJJF World Champion (2006 blue, 2007 purple, 2008 combined brown/black division, 2014 2015)
 IBJJF World No-Gi Champion (2008 combined brown/black division)
 IBJJF Pan American Champion (2009 combined brown/black division, 2008 combined brown/black division)
 IBJJF Las Vegas International Champion (2014)

Instructor lineage 
Mitsuyo Maeda > Carlos Gracie Sr. > Helio Gracie > Carlos Gracie Junior > Ana Laura Cordeiro

Notes

References

External links 
 One Hell Of A Come Back-The Anna Cordeiro Story

Brazilian practitioners of Brazilian jiu-jitsu
Living people
People awarded a black belt in Brazilian jiu-jitsu
Female Brazilian jiu-jitsu practitioners
Brazilian submission wrestlers
World No-Gi Brazilian Jiu-Jitsu Championship medalists
Brazilian jiu-jitsu world champions (women)
Year of birth missing (living people)
Sportspeople from Minas Gerais
ADCC Submission Fighting World Champions (women)